WHLK (106.5 FM) is a commercial radio station licensed to Cleveland, Ohio, known as "106.5 The Lake" and carrying an adult hits format. Owned by iHeartMedia, the station serves Greater Cleveland and much of surrounding Northeast Ohio. WHLK's studios are located at the Six Six Eight Building in downtown Cleveland's Gateway District while the station transmitter is in nearby Parma. Along with a standard analog transmission, WHLK broadcasts over three HD Radio channels and is available online via iHeartRadio.

History
The station was originally supposed to be the home of WJMO-FM before a studio/call letter/format swap took place between the owners of WJMO and WSRS (now WERE) in 1958, putting the license in the hands of Tuschman Broadcasting Company. On May 4, 1960, the new station first signed on as WABQ-FM. By May 1961, the station changed its callsign to WXEN. The new callsign stood for XENophon Zapis, a station show producer who later helped to establish WZAK as that station's owner.

Throughout the 1960s and 1970s, WXEN and WZAK both featured mostly nationality programming, that is, one or two hour programs devoted to music and programming for different nationalities, such as Polish, Slovenian or Hungarian, with program hosts speaking in the native language. It used the slogan "The Station of the Nations." Tuschman Broadcasting Company sold both WXEN and WABQ to Booth Broadcasting of Detroit in 1964. Booth American installed a rock format on March 13, 1977 with the branding "ZIP 106", changing the call letters to WZZP on March 21, 1977.

Lite Rock 106½
The station changed to WLTF on March 5, 1984, and aired an Adult contemporary format as "Lite Rock 106½". Its "Lovelite" jingles were created for the station by Jim Brickman in 1987. WLTF was Cleveland's number one radio station through the late 1980s and early 1990s, with its morning program hosted by "Trapper Jack" Elliott also rated number one. Billboard magazine named WLTF the "Adult Contemporary Station of the Year" in 1991. Soon other stations such as WQAL and WDOK started competing head-to-head with similar formats and gaining market share.

Mix 106.5

Booth Broadcasting merged with Broadcast Alchemy and the merged company became Secret Communications in 1994, ultimately selling off both WLTF and WTAM to Jacor Communications in July 1997. Shortly afterwards, the station flipped its format to hot AC, branding itself as "Mix 106.5". The station changed its callsign to WMVX on October 17, 1997. Jacor would be absorbed by iHeartMedia (as Clear Channel Communications) in 1999. As WMVX, the station aired both the 80s and 90s versions of Backtrax USA with Kid Kelly. From 2004 to 2009, WMVX also carried American Top 20 with Casey Kasem until the show ended production.

From 2009 to 2010, it aired the weekday Valentine in the Morning show, based from KBIG in Los Angeles. WMVX was also the home to The Brian and Joe Radio Show, a popular local program, from September 1998 until April 2009; their dismissal was part of Clear Channel's nationwide budget and salary cuts.

106.5 The Lake
On November 12, 2010, WMVX flipped to an all Christmas music format, which lasted until Christmas Day. WMVX went back to its Hot AC format until 10 a.m. the following Wednesday (December 29), at which point it began to stunt by playing a wide variety of music from various genres. The station's website contained a countdown to the time that a new format would take effect, which was on the morning of January 3, 2011. Leading up to the change, an hour of songs with "New" in the title were played, such as Honeymoon Suite's "New Girl Now", The Shins's "New Slang", INXS's "New Sensation", the theme to The Newlywed Game, and Dead or Alive's "Brand New Lover". At 7:30 a.m. on January 3, 2011, the station changed its branding to "106.5 The Lake", and its format to adult hits. The first song played in the new format was Ian Hunter's "Cleveland Rocks". On January 17, 2011, the station adopted the callsign WHLK to reflect its new branding ("THe LaKe").

Current programming
WHLK does not feature any on air talent. The HD2 digital subchannel airs "Pride Radio" and HD3 digital subchannel airs Pride Radio Flashback - both feature dance and pop music for the LGBTQ community.

References

External links

1960 establishments in Ohio
Adult hits radio stations in the United States
IHeartMedia radio stations
Radio stations established in 1960
HLK